Naomi Ryan (born 24 May 1977 in Bournemouth, England) is a British actress who has appeared in Dream Team as Ashleigh King, Mile High as Lehann Evans and Coronation Street where she played Underworld factory worker Bobbi Lewis.

TV roles

Ryan has a recurring role  in EastEnders making her first appearance in July 2007 as a policewoman.

In 2008, she appeared in the new ITV soap opera Echo Beach as the character Jacqui Hughes.

In April 2009, Ryan appeared in a six-part storyline of The Bill as Becky James, a teacher.

In September 2011, Ryan starred in the New Autumn TK Maxx Television Advert.

In January 2012, she appeared in Doctors.

In September 2012, she appeared in the Doctor Who episode "Asylum of the Daleks".

References

External links

1977 births
British actresses
Living people
Actors from Bournemouth